Metzneria inflammatella is a moth of the family Gelechiidae. It was described by Hugo Theodor Christoph in 1882. It is found in the Russian Far East (Amur).

References

Moths described in 1882
Metzneria